Mince na dne fontán is the fourth album by Marika Gombitová, released on OPUS in 1983.

Track listing

Official releases
 1983: Mince na dne fontán, LP, MC, OPUS, #9113 1354/5
 1995: Mince na dne fontán, re-release, 2CD, re-release, Open Music #0027 5312
 2004: Mince na dne fontán: Komplet 4, 2CD (excluded track 7: "Keď svitá pod srdcom žien"), OPUS, #91 1354

Credits and personnel

 Marika Gombitová - lead vocal
 Kamil Peteraj - lyrics
 Ján Lauko - producer
 Jozef Hanák - sound director
 Ján Filo - sound director
 Michal Ivanický - technical coordination
 Igor Adamec - technical coordination
 Karol Dlugolinský - photography

One
 Marika Gombitová - writer 
 Ladislav Lučenič - bass, acoustic guitar, electric guitar, organ, piano, ARP Oddysey, Minimoog, vocoder, citare, drums, strings
 Dušan Hájek - drums
 Jozef Hanák - harmonique

Two
 Ján Lehotský - lead vocal, writer, piano, Roland Jupiter 4, Korg, Hohner piano, Fender piano, strings
 Ján Hangóny - guitar solo guitar, chorus
 Anastasis Engonidis - bass, chorus
 Karol Morvay - drums
 Jiří Vana - solo guitar
 Vlado Kaššay - chorus
 Ľuboš Stankovský - chorus

Legacy
In 2007, Mince na dne fontán placed at number 30 on the list of the 100 Greatest Slovak Albums of All Time.

Sales certifications

ČNS IFPI
In Slovakia, the International Federation of the Phonographic Industry for the Czech Republic (ČNS IFPI) awards artists since the cancellation of the Slovak national section (SNS IFPI). Currently, there are awarded Gold (for 3,000 units), and/or Platinum certifications (for 6,000 units), exclusively for album releases. Gombitová demonstrably won at least seven platinum, and three golden awards in total.

Export release

The export version of the album, entitled My Friend the Tree, was issued in 1984.

Track listing

Official releases
1984: My Friend the Tree, LP, MC, OPUS, #9113 1586

Additional credits and personnel
 Katarína Karovičová-Rybková - English transcription
 Štefan Danko - editor
 Zuzana Mináčová - photography
 M. Brocko - design

References

General

Specific

External links 
 

1983 albums
1984 albums
Marika Gombitová albums